The Marcus Garvey Prize for Human Rights is an award in the name of civil rights activist and founder of the Universal Negro Improvement Association and African Communities League (UNIA-ACL), Marcus Garvey, which has been given to distinguished individuals and human right leaders. The Rev. Dr. Martin Luther King Jr., for example, was posthumously awarded the honor on December 10, 1968.

Garvey was a Jamaican political leader, publisher, journalist, entrepreneur, and orator who was a proponent of the Pan-Africanism movement, to which end he founded the UNIA-ACL. He also founded the Black Star Line, a shipping and passenger line which promoted the return of the African diaspora to their ancestral lands.

References

Human rights awards